Scleroptilidae is a family of corals belonging to the order Pennatulacea.

Genera:
 Calibelemnon Nutting, 1908
 Scleroptilum Kölliker, 1880

References

Pennatulacea
Cnidarian families